Edward Rawson may refer to:
Edward Rawson (businessman) (1818–1893), businessman in Atlanta, Georgia
Edward Rawson (politician) (1615–1693), Secretary of the Massachusetts Bay Colony